

The Aeronautica Lombarda AL-12P (also known as the Ambrosini AL-12P) was a Second World War Italian transport glider built by the Aeronautica Lombarda for the Italian Army.

Design and development
 The AL-12P was designed by A. Ambrosini and was a high-wing cantilever monoplane with a wood-ribbed fuselage covered with stressed molded plywood. It wing had a foliated spruce plywood spar and was covered with plywood although the ailerons were fabric covered. It also had large slotted spoilers that could be opened perpendicular above and below the wing. The pilot and co-pilot sat side by side in the nose which made from plywood-covered welded steel tubes and was hinged to allow cargo to be loaded into the fuselage, a passenger door was fitted on the right hand side of the fuselage. It could carry 12 fully equipped troops or the equivalent weight in equipment. The company built 16 AL-12Ps for the Italian Army.

Ambrosini P.512
 After World War II, S.A.I.-Ambrosini modified at least one AL-12P to be powered by 2 ×  Alfa Romeo 115ter six-cylinder air-cooled engines and fitted with a revised undercarriage with shock absorber struts attached to the engine nacelles braced by V-struts from the fuselage sides.

Specifications (AL-12P / P.512)

See also

References

Note

Bibliography

1940s Italian military transport aircraft
Glider aircraft
High-wing aircraft
AL-12P
Aircraft first flown in 1943